Anandra is a genus of beetles in the family Cerambycidae, containing the following species:

 Anandra albomarginata (Pic, 1927)
 Anandra albovittata Breuning, 1940
 Anandra basilana Breuning, 1974
 Anandra bilineaticeps Pic, 1939
 Anandra capriciosa J. Thomson, 1864
 Anandra celebensis Breuning, 1966
 Anandra griseipennis Breuning, 1956
 Anandra laterialba Breuning, 1943
 Anandra latevittata Breuning, 1959
 Anandra pseudovittata Breuning, 1961
 Anandra strandi Breuning, 1940

References

Agapanthiini